Maliq-Opar is a community in the Korçë County, Albania. At the 2015 local government reform it became part of the municipality Maliq.

Culture
The masons of the area speak a unique sociolect known as Purishte.

References

Populated places in Maliq
Muzaka family
Villages in Korçë County
Albanian ethnographic regions